The following is a list of Xenosaga characters.

Development

After Xenosaga I, all the character models were redesigned for Xenosaga II. they were all radically altered. MOMO's and Jr.'s designs became "...taller, slimmer and less child-like" with the end result making MOMO appear slightly older. Shion loses her glasses and alters her wardrobe while KOS-MOS gets blue highlights in her hair. When the first two episodoes of Xenosaga were remade in Xenosaga I+II for the Nintendo DS they were altered to two-dimensional computer graphics with sprites and visual novel-style dialogue sequences.

Playable characters

Shion Uzuki

KOS-MOS

Ziggy
Voiced by (English): Richard Epcar (Episodes II & III)Voiced by (Japanese): Masashi Ebara

The stage of Xenosaga: Pied Piper takes place T.C. 4667, 100 years prior to the events of Xenosaga Episode I. Before he became Ziggurat 8, Jan Sauer was a Captain in the 1875th Special Operations detachment of the Federation Police Bureau. He and his squad were deployed to the planet Abraxas (later renamed Michtam) to investigate murders in the U.M.N.. These terrorist acts were caused by a cloaked individual under the hacker alias "Voyager".

Sauer became further intertwined with the destiny of the Zohar when he met the widow Sharon Rozas and her son Joaquin. Jan Sauer and Sharon developed a relationship which led to marriage.

With the help of his squad and Sharon's medical knowledge, Sauer's investigation draws closer to the funding source of Voyager's murders. This turns out to be Dimitri Yuriev, who quickly utilizes his connections within the government to have Sauer and his team removed from the investigation. This does not stop Sauer, even after he and some of his subordinates are arrested.

Only after the death of one of his subordinates, Mikhail Ortmann, does Sauer discover that another member of his team, Erich Weber, is Voyager. Erich explains in part his connection with U-DO, before his Voyager alias takes over and lures Sauer to witness his wife and son's deaths. At this point, Voyager becomes the Black Testament, and Sauer could do nothing to prevent his family's death. The Black Testament presented an ultimatum to Sauer: either to be killed and have his soul consumed by Voyager or to join him (as another Testament) and live forever. Sauer refused both fates and he chose to commit suicide.

The witnesses of events that led to his death were Melisse Ortus and Lactis. Two years after his suicide he was activated as the cyborg Ziggurat 8, and about 100 years later the events of Xenosaga Episode I unfold.

Dialogue by Wilhelm suggests that Jan Sauer had a "shining will," and implicates that at some point Jan was considered to become a Testament. Given that Xenosaga Pied Piper has not been released to the US, most of Jan Sauer's background and his relation to the Zohar remains a mystery in Episode I and Episode II. The developers did not disclose his background so that it could be revealed in Episode III, where Voyager makes his first appearance.

In Episode I Ziggurat 8 is commissioned by the S.O.C.E. to infiltrate a U-TIC organization base and rescue M.O.M.O. During their escape their spacecraft would have been destroyed by the U.M.N. column walls if not rescued by the Elsa, and so he meets with Shion and the rest of the Xenosaga cast.

When first called Ziggy by M.O.M.O., Ziggurat 8 seemed uncomfortable. He suddenly had a flashback of his lost son, Joaquin. He remembered that during his life as Jan Sauer he purchased a synthetic dog for his son, as on a police officer's salary could not afford a real dog. The company which manufactured the dog was Nexus (and the dog's model name was "Nexus 6"), which prompted his son to give the nickname Nex, a truncation of the company's name. His manufactured name was similarly truncated by M.O.M.O. This may have been the action that sparked Ziggurat 8's response to take on a fatherly role toward M.O.M.O.

Ziggy seems self-conscious of his present body, and shows discomfort when young women see him undergoing maintenance. However he shows trust in M.O.M.O., as he states because of the "purity of her heart." In Cathedral Ship, when Cherenkov diffuses into the Zohar emulator and begins his transformation into a Gnosis, Ziggy remarks how it is "the same, just like that day." This is a reference to the events which happened in his past (or Xenosaga Pied Piper) where Voyager transforms into the Black Testament, through the same method.

Ziggurat 8 seems to understand some of the events regarding the Zohar, however his general disposition is reserved, and the game does not reveal too much of what he could know of his previous life. In the KOS-MOS Encephalon, Ziggurat 8's past was not shown despite the fact it is stated KOS-MOS sensed everyone's memories, and Nephilim urged everyone to accept the entirety of their memory. chaos explains why his and Allen's memories are not in the encephalon—yet there is no mention of Ziggurat 8's memories not being there. It is unknown why his memories/fears were not explored in the Encephalon. It could be due to the game's development of Ziggy not being as major a character as Shion and Jr. (In Xenosaga I & II for the Nintendo DS, Ziggy reveals more of his past to the rest of the characters.)

His only assignment is to protect and support M.O.M.O., yet he accompanies the rest of the party as a support character. During the destruction of Proto Merkabah Ziggy helps rescue KOS-MOS after Shion's grip of her has slipped.

In Episode II Ziggy continues to protect M.O.M.O. beyond the scope of his assigned mission. He strongly encourages Juli Mizrahi to be maternal to M.O.M.O. and he may also have feelings towards M.O.M.O. similar to that of his lost son. This is suggested by the way he is affected both during and after M.O.M.O.'s analysis. When she collapses, a vivid memory is triggered of Voyager standing over a large pool of blood.

Ziggy relates to Albedo's immortality in Episode II when he says, "Death is rest for the soul. Who was it that said that? If the body did not die, and the fears borne in the mind just continued to pile up, the world would be nothing more than an eternal prison." When Juli Mizrahi performs maintenance on Ziggy, he reveals the reason why he committed suicide was because of the death of his son. They form a connection because of the loss of their children and the resulting painful memories. Despite Juli Mizrahi's sympathy for Ziggy, the cold reality of his state of life is shown when Ziggy is made the lead (on screen) character and he talks with other employees of the U.M.N. Control Center. A majority treat him as old property.

Within Labyrinthos, Ziggy was briefly focused in on when the information within Canaan was accessed. He became suddenly reserved and placed his hands behind his back. This could implicate he knows this Canaan might be in some way tied to the mysterious program "Canaan" mentioned by his Realian subordinate Lactis in the past (Xenosaga Pied Piper). Given this, Ziggy should recognize Dimitri Yuriev and his intent as well. As to why Ziggurat 8 does not disclose to the party the familiar connections of these events is not yet known. He does however, inquire Jr. to explain what U-DO is before they dive into M.O.M.O.'s subconscious. (In Xenosaga I & II for the Nintendo DS, Ziggy reveals his past to the rest of the characters.)

He sacrifices his cybernetic arm by breaking through a wall for the party's escape from the Ω System. When he is being repaired, Juli Mizrahi asks him to consider lifespan extension. Eventually he accepts, primarily for M.O.M.O.'s sake but it is also likely that the reappearance of his family's murderer has prompted him to carry on his life. At the end of Episode II he is to be stationed at the Kukai Foundation and remain on call as a bodyguard for M.O.M.O.

M.O.M.O.

MOMO Mizrahi is a character that plays a central part in the storyline of Xenosaga, especially during Episode II. Her first name is an acronym for Multiple Observative Mimetic Organicus.

In the video game and anime, MOMO is a Realian, a class of artificial humans. Specifically, she is a prototype 100-series Observational Realian developed through genetic engineering by Joachim Mizrahi to combat Gnosis, an alien that exist in a different plane of existence. She was created with the appearance and personality of a young girl and does not show the signs of aging.l Her primary motivation throughout the series is to fulfill the wishes of Joachim. She also seeks approval from Juli Mizrahi as something more than a replacement doll for her and her husband's deceased daughter, Sakura, with whom she was created in image. In addition she grows close to Ziggurat 8 "Ziggy" and Jr., both of whom lost someone dear to them as well.

Originally, MOMO was created by Joachim Mizrahi, a scientist, to resurrect U-DO. She was crafted in the likeness of his dead daughter, Sakura. He went so far as to tell MOMO that if she did good deeds, one day she could become a real human girl; that she could actually become Sakura.

After the death of Joachim Mizrahi, MOMO was rescued from her birthplace amidst the chaos of the Miltian Conflict and went to live on the planet Fifth Jerusalem, the hub of the Galaxy Federation, with Juli Mizrahi whom she termed "mother".

MOMO was programmed with the behavior and emotions of a twelve-year-old girl, and considers both Joachim and Juli Mizrahi to be her parents. Aside from her pink hair and the yellow eyes, MOMO is an otherwise perfect physical copy of their deceased daughter, Sakura.

Aside from Juli Mizrahi, the two most important figures in MOMO's life are Ziggurat 8 "Ziggy", whom she nicknamed after he rescued her and Jr.

In Episode I, MOMO's outfit closely resembles a Japanese schoolgirl's uniform. She takes the role in the series as a magical schoolgirl. Her weapon start out as short magical rods in Episode I and later, in Episodes II & III, as an Ether-based composite bow. The rods can be used to physically attack or to shoot musical- or petal-themed laser beams giving her both short- and long-ranged attacks, however when she wields a bow, it makes all of her attacks long-range. Among her Ether skills is the ability to transform into a more powerful version of herself by performing a transformation sequence. The costumes she wears determines the either-based abilities she has access to for a limited amount of time. In Episode III MOMO is specifically given new abilities to immobilize enemies by filling up an enemy's "Break meter".

Appearances
Juli Mizrahi and MOMO had a strained relationship due to her close resemblance to Sakura. Although MOMO is an organic being capable of thought and emotions, Juli finds MOMO to be just a reminder of her deceased daughter. Juli is unable to see MOMO as anything more than an artificial human until MOMO's near death during Episode II whereupon she realized she did care about MOMO.

Near the beginning of Episode I, Ziggy is assigned by S.O.C.E, and particularly Juli, to rescue MOMO from the U-TIC Organization and protect her until her safe return.

MOMO is central to the storyline because she contains the Y-Data. This has made her the target of kidnappings—specifically attempted kidnappings by Albedo and U-TIC— and manipulation her and her friends by U.M.N. to get the data for themselves. Later, during a near-fatal Y-Data extraction, she tried to stop Albedo from extracting it by destroying her mind, but the action was futile as Albedo was able to obtain it after threatening Jr. After these events, MOMO asked permission of Juli to assist the investigation of Old Miltia.

Left at the dawn of a new era after the events at Michtam, MOMO began to work with everyone to rebuild the world, with the belief that a new network was one way to save the world. She believed the network would reunite those who had already departed.

chaos
Voiced by (English): Joshua Seth (Episodes II & III)Voiced by (Japanese): Hoshi Soichiro

 joined the Elsa Crew two years prior to the events of Episode I. He is described in the official design materials as the one who ensures the safety of the crew during their travels. In that respect, it could be said that chaos is ship security, as he certainly serves that function. But he also serves in many other ship tasks, such as several in-flight functions and the moving of cargo. Essentially, he is a jack-of-all-trades.

chaos appears unaffected by physical aging, as is evidenced by the fact that he has the same physical appearance during the events that take place in the main story of Xenosaga, as well as during the time of the Miltian Conflict as a Veteran serving under the Galaxy Federation fourteen years prior and even appears in Pied Piper one-hundred years earlier.

In Episode II, Episode III, Pied Piper, and Xenosaga I&II, he is referred to as Yeshua, which is said to have been the Aramaic name for Jesus of Nazareth. It is also a shortened form of Yehoshua. The implications of chaos having some "divine" significance are scattered all throughout Xenosaga. The Anima Vessels, which are half of chaos, are also referred to as the "body of God." The database also calls chaos' power the "power of God."

It is speculated that chaos is in some way connected to Wilhelm, president of Vector Industries. Wilhelm is the only person who seems to truly know chaos, as well as recognize his significance in the greater scheme of things. In turn, chaos seems to be the only one who truly knows Wilhelm, as Wilhelm states in Episode III that chaos is the only one who can define him. There is a diametric opposition between the two characters, both physically and in terms of personality. Wilhelm has red eyes and pale skin, while chaos has green eyes and dark skin. Wilhelm is directly engaged in just about every aspect of the conflicts that take place within Xenosaga. On the other hand, chaos maintains a passive role, and seems content with following the path of the games' other protagonists.

Much of chaos' history is clouded, but it is known that 6,000 years ago, he was one of the disciples of a man that Ormus would come to worship as their Lord and Messiah. During this time, chaos was still known as Yeshua, and performed miracles in that man's place. Exactly what happened during this time period and why it happened, is unknown. However, there may be clues in Nephilim's mention of chaos teaching humanity long ago, and the reaction of Anima to the scriptures about the resurrection of Jesus Christ. (The suggestion of chaos as Jesus, as well as a traditional Jesus figure, seem to be yet another of Xenosaga's Gnostic touches. In Gnosticism, Jesus is actually two separate beings, a divine aeon Jesus, and a human Jesus. One cannot assert for certain however that chaos would be an aspect of Jesus. The only direct depiction involving the two is of chaos standing next to Mary Magdaelene as the two listen to a sermon by Jesus. By this interpretation chaos may have been a prophet or disciple of Jesus. It is also possible that chaos may have been one of the many angels said to have accompanied Jesus.) Wilhelm and the database also state that chaos had died, at least physically, during this era, and had left behind the "Word of Yeshua", also known as Lemegeton.

Lemegeton is represented in the material world as words, but it is actually a wavelength energy. Lemegeton can only be understood and spoken by chaos (Anima), and when recited, they can access and control the Zohar. Through the Zohar, energy from the Higher Domain of U-DO can be accessed. Humans are unable to speak the "words", however the ancient people and future researchers such as Grimoire Verum were able to create programs from Lemegeton to control the Zohar. This was used in all Relics of God that made use of the Zohar's energy, such as Zarathustra and Omega. The Song of Nephilim is an incomplete translation of Lemegeton. People of the Zohar, whose wills resonate strongly with Anima due to their special bloodline, are also capable of controlling the Zohar, with the strongest among them capable of communicating with U-DO. In this way, the power of Anima is also seen as a proxy between humans and the power of the Higher Domain. (Only those who resonate purely with Anima are capable of controlling it, while those who resonate passively with Anima lead to dispersal.)

In Episode III it is revealed that chaos is the human incarnation of Anima, a power derived from the collective unconscious of humanity and present since the beginning of the universe in this dimension. Anima is a force that appears to be behind the theme of Will to Power and individuality. This is the antithesis to the convergence and unity theme behind the power of the Animus.

Long ago at the beginning of the universe, certain wills of humanity resonated purely with Anima. According to the database, these were past incarnations of consciousnesses that are capable of being Testament, which includes the player characters of the Xenosaga Series. These wills began a chain reaction throughout the collective consciousness, resulting in the dispersal of consciousnesses, a phenomenon that led the universe towards destruction. The dispersing wills that reject the collective consciousness are commonly called Gnosis when seen in the real world. Eventually, the increasing dispersal of the collective consciousness would lead the universe to collapse.

To counter this, Anima also possessed a failsafe function. When consciousnesses of rejection—those that desire dispersal—exceed critical mass, the imaginary number domain collapses, which causes the collapse of the real number domain and, as a result, leads to the collapse of the entire universe, swallowing up the upper domain. This is the universe's desperate, dangerous situation. When a breakdown or error is produced in one part of a system, the "failsafe" is the function that keeps the effect from spreading to the entire system. It is for the sake of ensuring safety. In other words, it is thought that the Failsafe is the system that keeps a problem produced in one section of the universe from spreading its ill-effects to all the world. If that's the case, then it is thought that the function of the universe's Failsafe is something for the sake of avoiding the collapse of the entire universe, including both upper and lower domains.

To save chaos' life, and to prevent the destruction, Mary used her power of Animus to seal away the power of Anima into the twelve Anima Vessels. Mary did this by separating chaos' soul in two, into the Anima power and the Will of Anima, which is the failsafe. Then the Anima power was divided into the twelve Anima Vessels. While separated from his Anima power, chaos' failsafe ability could not ignite.

However, as long as Anima existed, the consciousnesses of the universe would continue to disperse until the universe was slowly destroyed by collapse. Wilhelm chose Eternal Recurrence to avoid this. By using Zarathustra he planned to perpetually rewind time to the past, living in an eternal cycle. This prevented both the collapse through dispersal and the destruction of wills by the failsafe. But this meant living the same lives over and over again.

At the end of Episode III, chaos rejected the Eternal Recurrence, deciding to trust in the wills of humanity to change the future. He realized his power might be used to save the universe with the help of human wills who wish for it. His final cryptic instructions to Shion and friends was to lead humankind back to Lost Jerusalem. He states that the key to saving the universe could be found on Lost Jerusalem, yet does not elaborate on what this means. Although chaos believes they will likely all meet again on Lost Jerusalem, given how long it would take to travel there, this may be hinting at future incarnations.

After the awakened KOS-MOS restored his power to him, chaos believed he would disappear with the release of his power to slow the destruction of the universe and allow humanity more time to find Lost Jerusalem. However, his consciousness lived on, as the consciousnesses of the universe still desired his existence. He still remains as the failsafe of the universe, although his future form is unknown.

After saving the Elsa by holding open one last U.M.N. gate to allow them to escape the shockwave of the dimensional shift, he is last heard speaking to KOS-MOS as she drifts through space. His last words: "I guess both you and I still exist in this world, after all. As long as people... as long as the universe desires it, we will continue to exist. We haven't finished what we have to do yet. So, until then, sleep well, KOS-MOS."

Gaignun Kukai Jr. (Rubedo) 
Voiced by (English): Brianne Siddall (Episodes II & III)Voiced by (Japanese): Eriko Kawasaki

Jr. was a survivor of the U.R.T.V. (U-DO Retro Virus) unit created by the scientist Dr. Yuriev to combat U-DO, a mysterious waveform that threatened to destroy the galaxy. Rubedo's unit number as a U.R.T.V. was 666. He possesses the unique abilities of all U.R.T.V.'s, including telepathy and various telekinetic powers. However, despite being a "designer child," he was born with his twin brother attached to him through the heart—a problem that was remedied when they were separated. He is the most powerful U.R.T.V. and is reputed to have the one perfect anti-U-DO wavelength (generated when Jr. goes into his "Red Dragon" mode), and was therefore made the leader of the U.R.T.V.'s. Although to date he hardly uses his unique powers compared to his living brothers, instead preferring to fight with his guns or machines, Albedo states that Rubedo is weaker than he was before either indicating a lax in training or that Albedo himself has become much stronger (or both). He was known as Rubedo, while his formerly conjoined twin brother was called Albedo, U.R.T.V. #667. Gaignun Kukai was the last brother, christened Nigredo.

Over the course of the first two games, Jr. and M.O.M.O. have grown very close to each other. This is due to Jr's past with Sakura Mizrahi, whom MOMO was modeled after. During his childhood, he promised Sakura that he would protect her mother and "little sister." That little sister was MOMO.

While Jr. looks like a child, and can act rashly, he is also capable of making tough decisions and cutting observations since he is in truth a matured man. He also has a fondness for guns, action movies, and classic novels, including The Adventures of Robinson Crusoe, The Wonderful Wizard of Oz, and Twenty Thousand Leagues Under the Sea. Because of his hobbies Jr. is a master of gunplay, especially with pistols, and enjoys fighting akimbo. At the beginning of Episode I, Jr. carries a pair of Rook Company pistols. However, in Episode II he wields two antique Makalov pistols.

During the Miltian Conflict, Rubedo and the other U.R.T.V.'s fought against U-DO before the planet's disappearance into the void known as the Abyss. As leader of the U.R.T.V.'s, Jr. was responsible for keeping them connected through a spiritual link, which would protect them from U-DO's destructive powers. A moment before the U.R.T.V.'s were to destroy U-DO, Rubedo had a vision of the Old Miltian planet being destroyed when something monstrous emerged from within. Rubedo, fearing for the lives of his companions, broke the Spiritual Link leaving the other U.R.T.V.'s with no protection against U-DO. U-DO slew or drove mad all of the standard U.R.T.V.'s, as well as Albedo during the fighting, and Rubedo carried an injured Nigredo several minutes before Canaan and chaos rescued the U.R.T.V. duo on the E.S. Asher. Therefore, the only documented surviving U.R.T.V.'s were Nigredo and Rubedo, though Albedo and Citrine survived as well.

Along with Albedo, Nigredo, and Citrine, Jr. is one of the "variants," U.R.T.V.'s who undergo a stimulated mutation. Superficially this caused his hair to turn a bright red and his eyes a deeper blue but more significantly it allowed him to pause his cellular development. In addition to that he has a unique power called "Red Dragon Mode." The "Red Dragon Mode" is a special power that Jr. has which allows him to amplify the anti-U-DO waves that are emitted by both himself and Standard U.R.T.V.'s. This apparently increases Jr.'s power to some degree as well, as when Jr. used the power when overcome with emotion in his one on one battle with his brother Albedo. Part of Gaignun's role as a U.R.T.V., besides being the future host of Dimitri Yuriev's consciousness seems to be a living stop-gap meant to keep Jr.'s "Red Dragon" from going out of control. He has a tattoo of a red Chinese dragon on his left upper-arm that somewhat symbolizes his "Red Dragon Mode." Rubedo subconsciously suppresses his Red Dragon mode; as an unintentional side effect, his aging is also suppressed.

Because Rubedo and Albedo began life as conjoined twins, the two share similar but opposite powers regarding the regulation of their cellular growth. Jr. is able to slow down his aging at the cellular level, thus his youthful appearance, and Albedo is able to speed up cell growth to the point of being able to instantly regenerate any part of his body. Furthermore, the database indicates that Jr.'s halted development is "half-subconscious" which may lead to questions as to whether Jr. has full control over his range of extraordinary abilities.

In Episode III, Jr. is forced to finally come to terms with issues surrounding the remains of his "family"; his brothers Albedo and Gaignun, his sister Citrine and his father Dimitri Yuriev. After the group confronts Dr. Sellers on the Tactical Warship Merkabah he reveals to them that the reason Dimitri Yuriev is still alive is because he is inhabiting the body of his "son", Nigredo aka Gaignun Kukai. He also tells Jr. what Yuriev's goals are and where to find him; on the Durandal. Jr. and the group return to the Kukai flagship to find the entire crew murdered by Yuriev soldiers with the exception of Mary and Shelly Godwin and the cruisers' two guests, Juli Mizrahi and Canaan. They head to the Isolation Area to stop Yuriev but before they can reach him they are confronted by U.R.T.V. #668, Citrine.

Jr. tries to plead with Citrine to step out of their way and how what she and Yuriev is wrong, but Citrine wants none of it. She is so dedicated to her father's ideals that she is willing to fight her own "brother" and die if need be. She is fought and killed by the party and Jr. derides the needlessness of her death and how he has lost yet another of his U.R.T.V. comrades. In the Isolation Area, Jr. comes face to face with Yuriev as he removes the Zohar Emulators from their containment units. As Jr. tries to reach Gaignun with his words Yuriev outlines his plan to conquer his fear of God (U-DO), by ascending to the realm of the gods himself and killing him. Before the group can stop him, the Durandal's engines kick in and the ship flies off on a collision course with Abel's Ark. Yuriev disappears into the inner recesses of Isolation Area and Jr. and the others are forced to evacuate before the ship is absorbed by the Ark.

Knowing Yuriev must be stopped, Jr. and the others descend into Abel's Ark and fight their way through the numerous defences Yuriev created within it. He eventually comes face-to-face with Yuriev and defeats both him and Ω Res Novae/Ω Metempyschosis. It is at this point when Albedo, as the White Testament arrives. He takes both the Zohar and Abel away from Yuriev then proceeds to deal with him directly.

Jr.'s reunion with Albedo is short-lived, as Albedo gets right down to business with him, ordering him to link with him and use their anti-U-DO waves to destroy Yuriev. Their plans go slightly awry when Gaignun's consciousness emerges from Yuriev's. Jr. is hesitant to destroy his brother and best friend, but when Gaignun says it must be done he resolves to finish it. It had been Albedo's plan to transfer Gaignun's consciousness into Jr.'s body, but Gaignun instead took over Albedo's body and threw Albedo's consciousness into Jr. Powerless to stop him, Jr. (and Albedo) was thrown backward as Gaignun proceeded to shift himself and Yuriev into a higher dimension. Before disappearing, Gaignun communicates with Jr., saying goodbye and showing Jr. his true form. At this point a grown up version of Jr. is briefly glimpsed, looking very similar to Gaignun and Albedo. Jr. then finally settles his ordeal with Albedo as the two become one single person, like they were meant to be in the first place.

From there, he follows Shion and the others to Michtam to stop Zarathustra and Wilhelm. When Shion's new mission presents itself at the end of the game, finding Lost Jeruselam, Jr. is the only surviving party member to accompany her and Allen when the Elsa departs.

As a matter of trivia, Jr.'s adult form was originally meant to appear in Episode II. In the original script written by Soraya Saga, part-way through the game Jr. unpauses his growth and rapidly ages to adulthood. This new adult Jr. would still be a playable character in the game and be part of several key sequences in the later sections of the game, such as a reunion with U.R.T.V. #668 Citrine and a three-way battle between KOS-MOS, U-DO and himself and Albedo. This version of Jr., and many other things from Saga's Episode II script were cut out by a new team of writers and editors brought in by Monolith during production. Like several other removed concepts, it was put back into Episode III, after a fashion. However, Jr.'s adult form only appears as a representation of Jr.'s true self instead of his actual self in the form of a playable character.

Jin Uzuki
Voiced by (English): Michael Gough (Episodes II & III)Voiced by (Japanese): Hideyuki Tanaka

He is first introduced in Episode I in a videophone conversation with his sister, Shion. He is then seen in the ending credits, praying at the graves of his parents.

During the Miltian Conflict, Jin managed to steal information from Margulis concerning the true nature of the Miltian Conflict—the Y-Data. After joining chaos and Canaan in their search for the U.R.T.V.s, the group was stopped by Margulis, who challenged Jin to a duel. Margulis displayed superior skill with his sword, wounding Jin during the duel. When it came to Ether skills, however, Jin proved to be the better. Both duelists hurled a ball of potent energy at each other. Margulis' sphere of energy crashed into Jin, knocking the breath out of him and severely weakening him. Jin's, however, hit Margulis in the face, which left the man with a vicious gash over his right eye that would eventually leave a permanent scar and makes the floor give out with Margulis on it.

While in the military, he was ranked directly under Margulis and was Pellegri's superior. Both Jin and Margulis trained under his grandfather, the swordmaster Ouga Uzuki. Ouga had also taught Shion martial arts abilities. Some of these martial art abilities, including a few sword fighting, may be seen in Episode II, if you decide to complete the certain GS quests to obtain a few of Jin/Shion Double Techs. Two examples are Phoenix Blade and Lion Heart.

After becoming aware of Margulis's treachery during the Miltian Conflict, Jin received information from his father Suou and began his own secret-information activities under then-Lieutenant General Helmer. His relationship with chaos also began during this period.

While he shared a deep connection with Pellegri during his time in the Federation military, they never walked the same path again, due to differences in their relative stations. It is a particularly sad conclusion considering that his mother Aoi, like Pellegri, had inherited the bloodline of the Immigrant Fleet, and the same blood clearly ran through Jin.

At the end of Episode III, Jin is mortally wounded by the Armaros Gnosis, being stabbed twice by its deadly blades, and dies beside the fallen E.S. Asher. Though he lost his life defending chaos and Nephilim within Zarathustra, his spirit—his consciousness—travels alongside Nephilim to Lost Jerusalem (Earth).

Canaan
Voiced by (English): Beng Spies (Episode II); Steven Blum (Episode III)Voiced by (Japanese): Hiroshi Kamiya

 is a special Realian created by Vector Industries. Like M.O.M.O., he can pilot an E.S., specifically E.S. Asher. He is not designed like the other Realians and is referred to as an "Enhanced Memory Model" by M.O.M.O. when they first meet in Helmer's office.

Canaan was sent on a mission during the Miltian Conflict by Lieutenant General Helmer along with chaos to retrieve the U.R.T.V.s and the Y-Data. During their mission the U-TIC Organization activates the Song of Nephilim. Canaan starts to become affected by it, but he fights off being overcome by it. Nearby, Federation Soldiers in A.M.W.S. are affected and start attacking Canaan and chaos. Jin Uzuki arrives in time and aids them. Shortly after, Jin shows them to the U.R.T.V.s location at Labyrinthos, headquarters of U-TIC. Margulis appears, and he and Jin fight. After the fight, Jin entrusts Canaan with information regarding the Miltian Conflict, which is also a fragment of the Y-Data. After uploading the data into Canaan, Jin leaves. Then something happens to Canaan (appearing as a strange black cloud in the sky which engulfs Canaan and causes him to pass out; chaos also sees this, but it is unknown if he was affected) and the information handed over to him becomes inaccessible to him. Some unknown time later, they continue their search for the variant U.R.T.V.s and find two of them: Rubedo (also known as Jr.), who is carrying out a wounded Nigredo (Gaignun Kukai). They rescue them both, but no other U.R.T.V.s. are reported being saved.

Fourteen years later Canaan is still unable to read the data that is locked inside his head. A side-effect of his mysterious affliction is occasional black-outs accompanied by data loss. He has spent much time during the years since the Miltian Conflict at Vector's 2nd Division on Second Militia attempting to extract the Y-data from his head. Representative Helmer asked him to aid Jr., chaos, Ziggy, and M.O.M.O. as they are under attack by U-TIC A.W.M.S. Units. He arrives in time and finishes the fight, by attacking Pellegri. During the fight their E.S. units freeze as if they are stopped in time. This is possibly their Vessels of Anima reacting to each other, or some unknown phenomena causing this. (the player can see someone for a brief second in an P.S. Gad with arms crossed on a building.) Eventually during the game he joins the main characters (although as an NPC) as they return to Old Milita to extract the data and analyze it.

With his name "Canaan," it has been speculated that he shares something in common with Lactis, a prototype Realian from Xenosaga: Pied Piper. In Xenosaga: Pied Piper, a Mysterious Voice (chaos) speaks to Lactis, and tells him to protect "Canaan," which the voice says, is "inside" of Lactis. In Xenosaga I & II there are hints that Lactis was Canaan's past incarnation. And in Episode III, it is finally confirmed that Canaan and Lactis are indeed both one and the same individual; created at first to observe Jan Sauer and Voyager, and then in the current future timeline 100 years after the events of Pied Piper to observe Shion and co. During the time of Pied Piper, the recording component ("personality") used was that of Lactis. Afterwards however the recording component was reformatted but the personality was still in use inside the current Canaan. Proving something not thought to be theoretically possible, a level of transcending consciousness that actually exists inside of Realians.

After being antagonised by Doctus for the majority of the first half of Episode III, Canaan comes to realize his actual identity after analyzing data corresponding to 'Program Canaan' itself, but also in doing so realizes his true nature having been an unintentional spy for Wilhelm all along. He reveals to chaos how he believes that he himself is an existence that would only bring suffering to others and confides in him. Voyager however, later breaks the secret of Canaan's true identity and purpose to the main party, much to the shock of Jr. & Ziggy.

In Episode III, the special characteristics of Program Canaan allow Canaan to secure a bypass route to Wilhelm's power. Canaan, cleverly using Voyager's desires after the battle with E.S Dan, convinces him that even Wilhelm could die and his power as a Testament could fade and connects Voyager's consciousness with the Compass of Order and Chaos. Canaan chides Voyager for his hubris at touching something that the hands of man were never supposed to touch and admits that he wants to protect his friends the best he can before finally wishing the main party success in their mission. Clutching Voyager's hand to his forehead and continuing the connection, both he and Voyager are sent into phase space, destroying both of their bodies.

Canaan is a temporary playable character for Episode III only during the first dungeon and uses an energy knife in battles; he remains with the party as a guest following that.

"Canaan" is an ancient term meaning the area around present-day Israel, western Jordan, southern Syria and southern Lebanon. It is also the name of one of the grandsons of the biblical Noah. Canaan, the fourth son of Ham, was cursed by Noah for the wrongdoings of his father.

Miyuki Itsumi
Voiced by (English): Heather Hogan (Episodes II & III)Voiced by (Japanese): Emi Uwagawa

 is a systems programmer in Vector Industries First R&D Division involved in the KOS-MOS project under Chief Engineer Shion Uzuki. Miyuki is an avid mechanic, Episode I's on-board encyclopedia describes her as an otaku. She is always throwing together new inventions and constantly badgers her fellow R&D colleagues to be her guinea pigs. Shion's M.W.S. Mk. I and Mk. II are both products of her engineering genius. While she is very good friends with Miyuki, Shion is often greatly annoyed by her constant expense authorization requests so she can build new experimental products under the pretense of the K-PX Project. Miyuki has made quite the hobby out of sending off patent applications to the Federation Patent Office, though it's not known how many of her inventions actually have authorized patents. She seems to be rather wrapped up in herself and her work though because she seems capable of completely forgetting about other people, like Allen. However, Itsumi is somewhat involved in a relationship with Togashi, a fellow Vector employee.

After the Woglinde was destroyed by the Gnosis, Miyuki puts in a transfer to Second R&D Division and is accepted. Her former supervisor Shion, who was separated from her team as a result of the incident, did not learn about it until much later. Miyuki came riding to Shion and her companions' rescue in Episode I when the Gnosis mounted an assault on the Kukai Foundation when they were drawn to Second Miltia by Albedo and the Song of Nephilim. After Vector's new anti-Gnosis super weapon, the Rhine Maiden had cleared out most of the Gnosis from the surrounding area Miyuki supplied Shion and KOS-MOS with a Phase Transfer or P.T. cartridge which KOS-MOS could integrate into her present armament and use to reveal whatever was drawing the Gnosis to Second Miltia. It is not stated which of the four Vector vessels (the Woglinde II, the Wellgunde, the Floßhilde or Vector's headquarters the Dämmerung) Miyuki was on at the time of the incident. Shion asks her where she's contacting them from, but Miyuki does not answer the question and elects to boast about the Rhine Maiden instead.

In Episode II Miyuki's role is negligible at the very best, appearing only at the start of Disc Two after Shion's opening narrative and at the end of the game when she welcomes her and Allen home on the Dämmerung after their ordeal at Old Miltia.

When Shion leaves her job at Vector after the events of Xenosaga: A Missing Year, Miyuki keeps in constant contact with her. She even goes so far as to offer her direct help when Shion begins to work with the anti-Vector organization Scientia. At the start of Episode III she joins in on a mission to break into Vector's top secret S-Line Division databank and steal classified data on the Zohar control program Lemegeton. She later turns up on Fifth Jerusalem to help the party break into the Project Zohar weapons testing facility in order to rescue KOS-MOS from the scrap heap. In both instances she is a playable guest character, one of three in the game. On an interesting note, she not only uses Shion's original red M.W.S from the first game but one of her tech moves is one of Shion's own Tech Attacks from Episode 1, namely Lightning Blast.

Allen Ridgeley
Voiced by (English): Dave Wittenberg (Episodes II & III)Voiced by (Japanese): Hiroaki Hirata

Former Vice Chief of Vector Industries First R&D Division's KOS-MOS Project Joint Operation Systems Development, Allen is an assistant to Shion Uzuki and comic relief throughout the series. After graduating from Bormeo University, Allen joined Vector Industries' First R&D Division in T.C. 4764 and was placed on the KOS-MOS development project under then Chief Engineer Kevin Winnicot and Junior Chief Engineer Shion Uzuki. Although two years Shion's senior in age, in Vector he's one year her junior. After the incident where the KOS-MOS Archetype was prematurely activated by U-TIC, which resulted in Kevin's death, Shion was promoted to Chief Engineer and continued her mentor/fiancé's work while Allen was then promoted to Shion's former position as Junior Chief Engineer.

While Allen is a major presence he primarily stays in the background and lets the other main characters take a more active role in events. After chaos joins the party full-time Allen often takes his usual station on the bridge of the Elsa. In Episode II he accompanied Shion through the deep interior of the Dämmerung and helped her find E.S. Dinah, which the two piloted to Old Milita and broke the Federation quarantine.

When Dinah was attacked en route by Voyager, the Black Testament, Allen manned the E.S. Unit's weaponry while Shion did her best to pilot the craft through his attack drones' fire. Just when all seemed lost the two were saved by KOS-MOS, who was awoken on Second Milita when she sensed Shion was in peril and flew off to her rescue.

Allen is mostly overlooked by his fellow Vector workers. When Shion was able to reconnect with Miyuki after the Woglinde disaster, Miyuki noted that she never even noticed that Allen was missing when he had been with Shion the whole time. He is deeply in love with Shion, but has had some trouble expressing his feelings to her for a multitude of reasons. Shion is apparently oblivious to Allen's clearly intense feelings; rather obvious comments are made by various characters in front of Shion throughout the series which she never seems to register. Furthermore, Allen feels that trying to approach Shion on a romantic level would only be harmful to her until she can put the past involving her former love Kevin Winnicot behind her.

It appears that Allen comes from a wealthy family background, but he has since left that behind and does not wish to dwell on his past. One of his secret passions is fishing.

When Shion leaves Vector to join Scientia, Allen is promoted to the position of Chief Engineer of the First R&D Division and the KOS-MOS project shortly before it is canceled in favor of Roth Mantel's T-elos project. However, Allen has some trouble being addressed as "Chief" and continues to use this term (as a term of endearment) to refer to Shion Uzuki, who officially has no title at all, not working for Vector.

Allen often puts himself in harm's way in order to protect Shion. When the Woglinde was attacked by Gnosis, instead of fleeing with the rest of Vector's staff, he followed KOS-MOS when she went searching for Shion and ended up using an assault rifle to fend off Gnosis along with Lt. Virgil while they all made their way to the escape pods. He goes with Shion disguised as a U-TIC researcher to investigate Labyrinthos, and also shows a lot of concern for her well-being when she passes out from what appears to be over-exertion throughout the course of the story. Near the end of the story, he confronts Kevin for using Shion and KOS-MOS, almost dying by Kevin's hand in an attempt to convince Shion to stay with her friends. He also throws himself in front of a Gnosis that was prepared to attack an unarmed Shion.

At the end of Episode III, Allen accompanies Shion along with Jr., to find Lost Jerusalem. In Episode III, Allen is a playable character for a brief time during the game after Shion is captured by Margulis and the U-TIC Organization on the "Past Miltia". He wields a futuristic crossbow, however like all extra characters his equipment cannot be changed and he does not possess a Skill Line like the main characters. His stats with equipment are better than Miyuki's and near even with Canaan, though he is more fragile than Canaan. Allen's fighting style is much like his usual role in the games: a weak physical presence geared more toward assistance and support with a couple of unexpectedly strong points such as breaking (breaking is an attack technique that can render an enemy or ally unable to do anything for two turns). At the point in the game where Allen is a playable character, his break tech is strong enough to break most enemies in one or two rounds, allowing the stronger main characters an easy chance to do the physical damage Allen cannot.

Other characters

Albedo

Voiced by (English): Crispin Freeman (Episodes II & III)Voiced by (Japanese): Koichi Yamadera

 is U.R.T.V. Unit 667, and one of the few surviving U.R.T.V.s from the Miltian Conflict. He is highly educated in a number of subjects, including but not limited to philosophy, science, language and religion, particularly ancient (in the Xenosaga universe) Christianity. He is also adept at complex strategic planning and anticipating his enemies' moves well in advance. Albedo also has the power to regenerate his own limbs, and thus he has the power to never die. This is also the reason for his mental instability as the thoughts of seeing friends and family get old and die over time crushed him as a child, and thus contributed to his current mental state.
He was the main antagonist of Xenosaga I, and Xenosaga II. After that, Albedo was the new White Testament in Xenosaga III.

Elsa Crew
These six men, along with several droids, own and operate the passenger/cargo cruiser Elsa Von Brabant, also known as the Elsa. Despite their humble status as a small tramp freighter, they are privately employed by the Kukai Foundation (due to Matthews' enormous debt to Gaignun Kukai), and are commonly called upon by the Foundation to take part in dangerous missions. However, this does not stop Captain Matthews from involving the Elsa in shady side jobs in desperate attempts to pay off his debt.

Captain Matthews
Voiced by (English): Kirk Thornton (Episodes II & III)Voiced by (Japanese): Unshou Ishizuka

 is the Captain of the Elsa Von Brabant. He owes a substantial debt to Gaignun Kukai. Matthews once served as a Galaxy Federation Marine with current Ormus Society A.M.W.S. pilot Hermann. He is also an avid fan of the Seraphim Sisters, and often dreams of going to one of their concerts once the debt has been cleared. He wears a hat that says "Caution! I'm a boozer. Banzai! Banzai!"

Captain Matthews' infamous debt is reportedly due to his frequent and frivolous spending habits. According to chaos, "no one holds a greater amount of debt than the Captain." One of the most difficult Global Samaritan missions in Episode II involve helping the Elsa droids to pay off the gargantuan debt (10 Million G), apparently in part due to the Professor adding his Robot Academy into the Elsa. It is unknown whether or not the debt will have reappeared a year later in Episode III. (It is thought that Captain Matthews' name may be derived from the Biblical Apostle Matthew, who was believed to be a tax collector.)

Captain Matthews seems to have a certain fondness for the varied and eccentric droids that serve on board the ship, (which is returned in kind), and he has named them all after his favorite drinks.

Hammer
Voiced by (English): Jason Spisak (Episodes II & III)Voiced by (Japanese): Taiki Matsuno

 is the navigator of the Elsa Von Brabant. Hammer has a vast knowledge of the U.M.N. net, which got him into trouble in his teens, when he hacked into a criminal organization's database. It was Captain Matthews who rescued him during this time. Despite his near fugitive status since then, his genius and engineering skill has resulted in Vector's many failed attempts to recruit him. At times his opinion on how to fly the ship clashes with that of Tony, with whom he has been friends since childhood.

Although it is his job, Hammer seems to dislike scavenging the wreckage of starship disasters, like the wreck of the Woglinde. However, once he gets down to business, any misgivings he has about scavenging quickly vanish: Hammer made quick work out of both the Federation escape pod and the wrecked U-TIC AutoTechs that made their way onto the Elsa. chaos' A.G.W.S. unit in Episode I was pieced together by Hammer from A.G.W.S. parts scavenged from battle fields.

This character in Xenosaga resembles a non-anthropomorphic animal version of a similar character also named Hammer in Xenogears.

Tony
Voiced by (English): Henry Dittman (Episodes II & III)Voiced by (Japanese): Takehito Koyasu

 is the Elsa Von Brabant's skilled helmsman, who enjoys piloting in difficult situations. Although quite normal and pleasant most of the time (several comments suggest that Tony is slightly spiritual and philosophical at times), his personality completely changes while piloting; he becomes a complete maniac. Tony's piloting skills come into play several times throughout the series; he outruns a squad of U-TIC Auto-Techs by riding the column wall in Hyperspace, gets Shion and her companions into and out of Proto Merkabah and seamlessly guides the Elsa through a maze of Ormus Society warships bent on destroying the ship before it can reach Old Miltia. At the end of Episode II, Tony is seen aboard the Elsa ferrying Jin Uzuki back to Second Miltia. In Episode III, Tony returns once again as the Elsa's pilot, shuttling the party to and from most of the major locations in the game. When Voyager invades the Elsa's hangar looking to abduct KOS-MOS Ver. 3's remains and return them to Wilhelm. Tony participates in the battle to save her, brandishing twin pistols—one black, one white.

Tony claims to be the best pilot anywhere, according to chaos, but as Tony has a massive ego when it comes to his piloting skill ("Tony, numero uno!"), the truth of this remains unknown.

Professor
Voiced by (English): Steve BlumVoiced by (Japanese): Takeshi Aono

, aka The Professor is an eccentric old scientist who is obsessed with creating an "Indestructible Giant Robot." With help from Shion and friends in Episode I he creates Erde Kaiser, a giant combiner-robot from old parts found in various Segment Addresses. In Xenosaga: The Animation the Professor has a prominent role in the episodes which take place on the Foundation. He oversees Shion's Encephalon dive when she dives into KOS-MOS' mainframe in order to retrieve evidence that proves the Kukai Foundation's innocence in the Woglinde disaster. Erde Kaiser appears on a poster in the Professor's lab but does not physically appear in the anime.

In Episode I he was living on the Kukai Foundation, but in Episode II through circumstances not quite understood, even to Captain Matthews, the Professor relocated his Robot Academy onto the Elsa. With the help of Shion and friends, the Professor defeated his nemesis, the Dark Professor and Dark Erde Kaiser.

He designed and built the Elsa Evolution.

In Episode III, the Professor is still aboard the Elsa, and appears to be more involved in the main plotline, even appearing in full cutscenes. He, along with Scott and Allen rebuild KOS-MOS after she is destroyed by T-elos on Rennes-le-Chateau. He calls Allen "Assistant #2" and KOS-MOS "Assistant #3".

Assistant Scott
Voiced by (English): Brian ChaseVoiced by (Japanese): Kazuya Nakai

 is the assistant of the Professor who built Erde Kaiser. His bizarre name is because the Professor insists on calling him "Assistant Scott", and Scott happily goes along with it, as he is simply overjoyed to be assistant to the Professor he idolizes. He assists the Professor in building the Erde Kaiser mecha in Episode I and Episode II. He also assisted the party in hacking KOS-MOS in the anime. He is currently a member of the Elsa Crew, along with the Professor.

Assistant Scott and the Professor often argue, but are united in their fanatical enthusiasm for building giant robots. As seen in the anime and Episode I, Assistant Scott sometimes feels that the Professor does not appreciate him. In the anime, Assistant Scott seemed to find a kindred spirit in Allen, which also seemed to be echoed by Assistant Scott in Episode II when he was happy to learn that Allen had come aboard the Elsa.

Febronia
Voiced by (English): Kari Wahlgren (Episode III)Voiced by (Japanese): Mariko Kouda

, aka Feb, was a Realian belonging to the Uzuki family. He ran a small church near the U-TIC HQ on Old Miltia, and was also Shion's caretaker. No longer a "living being," he was killed at his church 14 years prior to the events of Xenosaga Episode I. Feb's sisters Cecily and Cathe were part of a machine keeping the Original Zohar in power, deep within the walls of Labyrinthos on Old Miltia. In Episode I, Feb helps Shion confront her haunted past, and in Episode II he lures Shion to Old Miltia to "save" Cecily and Cathe and is therefore key to the destruction of the Patriarch. In Episode III, important details of his past are revealed, i.e. his relationship with former Lieutenant and current Testament Virgil. During the Miltian Conflict, Virgil was badly injured, and Febronia took him in and tended to his wounds. The two developed a deep affection for one another. However, when rampant Realians attacked her church, Virgil was in no condition to fight them off. In an attempt to protect Virgil and young Shion, Febronia essentially offered himself to the Realian mob and was brutally killed before being cannibalized. Virgil was traumatized by this incident, and it was the primary factor in causing both his intense hatred of all Realians and his DME Addiction.

While he is an important character in all three episodes, Febronia is conspicuously absent from the TV Asahi animated adaptation of Episode I entitled Xenosaga: The Animation, save a half-second long cameo at Virgil's death. This vision of Virgil's also appears in I&II.

Gaignun Kukai
Voiced by (English): Crispin Freeman (Episodes II & III); Jennifer Hale (child, Episode II); Wendee Lee (child, Episode III)Voiced by (Japanese): Koichi Yamadera; Mikako Takahashi (child)

 is the chairman of the Kukai Foundation, a special organization based in Miltia. His older brother Jr., charades as Gaignun's son. Gaignun is the charismatic leader of the massive and wealthy Kukai Foundation. Gaignun has black hair and deep green eyes. His gentle personality and humanitarian nature is well respected both within and outside the Foundation. Gaignun is falsely listed as the first son and heir to the industrialist Soze Kukai.

Gaignun Kukai is really U.R.T.V. Unit #669, who is a biological weapon designed to combat U-DO. U.R.T.V. Unit #669 is nicknamed , a reference to his black hair. Gaignun can telepathically communicate with Jr. and Albedo and can use his voice to hypnotically manipulate people, if need be he can telekinetically destroy a person. "Kukai" was a fictional persona created by the Second Miltian government as a means to pool their special operation funds. Following the Miltian Conflict and Helmer's rescue of Gaignun and Jr., they took on the Kukai surname to justify and establish the Kukai Foundation. This also allowed the U.R.T.V. units to live their lives more normally. The name Gaignun was derived from a name Nigredo gave to one of his pet cat's that died during the Conflict.

Towards the later parts of Episode I Gaignun is first introduced to the main party when they first enter the Kukai Foundation, Shion however upon meeting him felt that she had just apparently acted quite rude to him while shaking his hand and noticing his #669 brand on the palm of his hand, possibly alluding that even Shion was able to see or detect Gaignun's powers and true nature. Afterwards Gaignun is arrested by Cpt. Roman on allegations of treason along with most of the main party and put into a separate holding facility until the main party had proved the Kukai Foundation's innocence through KOS-MOS's triple A data recordings shortly prior to Albedo first using the Song of Nephilim. When Albedo eventually did use the Song of Nephilim, only Gaignun, chaos & Jr. could hear the song being played at first while on the Durandal. On the bridge almost immediately after, Gaignun and Jr. conversed telepathically over the proceedings until Shion was able to faintly hear the song being played. As the ending credits roll Gaignun is seen one last time discussing the status quo with Helmer over a video link, commenting that a vortex of temptation and obsession still remains in the aftermath of the games climax and finally adds that Albedo is being drawn into it all just the same.

In Episode II, Gaignun's past relationships with Albedo and Jr. are explored. He is first requested by Helmer when arriving on Miltia with M.O.M.O. to obtain reconnaissance information from a brief conversation with Albedo via a telepathic link in order to gain insight into Albedo's plans for the future tense, the two converse with Gaignun offering to come to terms with Albedo at the time but Albedo was only interested in goading his brother and even goes as far as calling him two-faced when Gaignun kinetically destroyed Albedo's right arm at one point during the conversation when Albedo had threatened Rubedo's life. Later on flashbacks occur when the main team take subconscious dives into Sakura Mizrahi's mind in order to allow her to speak once again. These adventures showed the rift growing between the trio of U.R.T.V. units, which eventually led to a breakdown during the Miltian Conflict, causing Albedo to come into contact with U-DO and become insane. At the end of Episode II, Gaignun suffers from a double personality; one part is Gaignun, the other is Dimitri Yuriev, his father. Dimitri most likely created Gaignun just as a host for his consciousness, for he somehow transmigrated into his body at the time of his "death" in TC 4753 when Gaignun as Nigredo in his childhood had apparently shot and killed his father. Yuriev awakened in Gaignun's body during the events of Episode II. Although Gaignun's consciousness now struggles to regain control of his own body, Yuriev currently has complete control of him and first makes his renewed presence known to Pellegri on a video link, tasking her to tell her superiors that he is not dying...ever.

Gaignun's dilemma throughout the series had always been secretly that he had struggled with the notion of eventually killing his own brother Rubedo, a task that was highlighted by Albedo earlier during their telepathic link in Episode II in which he had known about Gaignun/Nigredo's true form for many years. In truth his actual creation and very meaning to his own existence was to simply monitor his own brother Rubedo and if necessary terminate his life, to this end Yuriev had secretly implemented a second Red Dragon drive inside of Nigredo in the expressed purpose of rivaling Rubedo's power but as we see in Gaignun's nature he hides it all the way throughout the series.

In Episode III Gaignun's story comes full circle resulting in his eventual redemption when he comes to terms with what he is and had always been, Albedo arriving as a Testament during Yuriev's power bid after kidnapping Abel and the Zohar sheds some light on the fact that Gaignun had presumably let his own father take control of his body during the takeover with the thoughts of making his father proud somehow. As Albedo and Jr. initiate a link in order for Gaignun to be sent into Jr.'s body whilst Albedo in his Testament form would be sent into another dimension with their father Yuriev still in Gaignun's body. Gaignun however seeing through Albedo's feelings during this link expresses that he does not like taking orders and makes a desperate attempt at switching this vis a vis of minds around however resulting in Albedo's mind being thrown into Jr.'s body evidently reuniting the twin brothers for the first time in one body since their very birth. Saying his farewells to Rubedo/Jr. inside of Albedo's Testament body, Gaignun shows his brother his true form and tells him that his duty to keep watch over him has now ended or rather that he had wanted it to be over, but admits that if he had denied his nature in the end he would have been literally denying his own existence regardless. Jr. makes a last-ditch attempt at saving him by telling him they were always friends as Gaignun/Nigredo offer's to him that he'd like to play with his brothers again someday as he is sent into another dimension.

Gaignun shares his name with the horse that Roland, a general serving under King Charlemagne and wielder of the legendary blade Durandal, rode into battle on. Kūkai is also the name of a famous Japanese Buddhist monk; Buddhist undertones can also be seen in Xenosaga. The name Nigredo refers to the philosophic beliefs of Carl Jung, who believed that the process of self-realization has three major steps, which he named using terms derived from alchemy, which he studied prior to developing his theories. These three steps are known as Nigredo, the death of the old, perceived self, Albedo, the discovering of one's inner identity, and Rubedo, the process of living a self-aware life.

In the series, Jr. and Gaignun both raised a cat named Gaignun, which is the origin of Nigredo's (and Jr's) alias.

Vanderkam
Voiced by (English): Keith Szarabajka (Episode II); George Manley (anime)Vanderkam is a Lieutenant Commander working for the U-TIC Organization and a covert operative of the Federation Military. He has a tattoo of a purple X across his face and has this nasty habit of punching employees he thinks are slacking off.

This character in Xenosaga resembles an extremely similar character with a tattoo of a purple plus sign also named Vanderkam in Xenogears.

Mary Godwin
Voiced by (English): Ali Hillis (Episodes II & III)Voiced by (Japanese): Rie Kugimiya; Ryōko Shiraishi (anime)

 is the close sister of Shelley Godwin. Although she holds no true rank in the Kukai Foundation organization, Mary functions as Jr.'s second-in-command on board the Durandal as well as the Chief of the Kukai Foundation's Strategy Division. Everyone in the Foundation respects her and values her opinions in spite of her unofficial affiliation. In fact, many members of the Kukai Foundation have initiated the "Mary & Shelley Fan Club", at the suggestion of Jr. himself. Mary is quite fond of Jr. in spite of his childlike appearance. She was born on Miltia but speaks with an unknown planetary accent. Mary is also fun loving and the life of the party within the Foundation. Her name, along with Shelley's, comes from Mary Shelley, the creator of Frankenstein.

Mary is also a temporarily playable character in Episode I. She appears in Jr.'s introduction when he has to infiltrate the U-TIC battleship. Mary, along with another Kukai Foundation soldier, are in A.G.W.S. during battle sequences; neither of them have in-battle character models like Virgil does. Mary pilots a pink Vector A.G.W.S.

Shelley Godwin
Voiced by (English): Ali Hillis (Episodes II & III)Voiced by (Japanese): Yumi Takada; Wakana Yamazaki (anime)

 is the navigator and helmsman of the Durandal. Along with Mary, Shelley is often seen with Gaignun Kukai. She is idolized by many of the Kukai Foundation through the "Mary & Shelley Fan Club" as well. Shelley possesses a genius IQ, and is capable of performing and excelling in many complicated tasks while navigating the massive Durandal through the far reaches of space. She was also once part of a group of people who were illegally "owned" by a pharmaceutical company that used them as guinea pigs. Twelve years ago, Gaignun saved Shelley and Mary and they made the Foundation their new home.

Helmer
Voiced by (English): Stuart Robinson (Episode II); Keith Szarabajka (Episode III)Voiced by (Japanese): Masaru Ikeda

 was once a Lieutenant General in the Federation military and was the one who gave orders to chaos and Canaan to secure the U.R.T.V.s. Following the incident, he got into politics and eventually worked his way up the ladder to become Second Miltia's representative in the Galaxy Federation Government. Along with former U.R.T.V.s Rubedo (#666) and Nigredo (#669) he co-established the Kukai Foundation, which was created to investigate the Miltian Conflict 14 years ago on Old Miltia and keep tabs on the secret U-TIC Organization. Indeed, Helmer has a solid friendship with Jr. and Gaignun, as is evident by the formation of the aforementioned Foundation.

Helmer seems to be well known in the Xenosaga universe. Besides knowing Canaan, chaos, Jr., Gaignun, Dr. Juli Mizrahi and Jin Uzuki he is also on good terms with Vector Industries' CEO Wilhelm. The two were seen discussing matters of security prior to Wilhelm's assistance with the Song of Nephilim incident and the Gnosis attack on the Kukai Foundation. However, this is the only time the two discussed matters; they are not close allies. The Patriarch of the Ormus Society also seems to know him and is not very fond of him, and that sentiment is also echoed by Commander Margulis.

In Xenosaga Episode I, Helmer was in trouble with the Galaxy Federation when an Ormus/U-TIC insider in the Federation helped hatch a plot that framed both Second Miltia (Helmer's planet) and the Kukai Foundation for the destruction of the Woglinde. Helmer and the Federation showed no signs of improving relations after Xenosaga Episode I, although they are not enemies. Moreover, Helmer's role in both Xenosaga Episode I and II remains strictly behind the desk. Outside the Miltian Conflict, Helmer's most significant roles include careful handling of the aforementioned "framing incident", the arrangement of saving Shion and her allies on numerous occasions, and many other political matters seen in the series. Helmer also seems to have extensive knowledge of the wave existence known as "U-DO" that may extend upon what happened at Miltia.

Helmer appears very briefly in Episode III, though never in person in the game. He is seen during the Planetary Disappearance Phenomenon, where he gives an update on the situation to Jr. and the party and says a quick but meaningful good bye before the Durandal loses the signal from Second Miltia and shown to be alive in the ending, communicating with Mary and Shelley on the Elsa.

Although Helmer's role on the political stage is significant, several matters about this man are still shrouded in history, including his role in the Miltian Conflict. He has a friendly working relationship with Wilhelm; however, he does not seem to be privy to or aware of any of his plans. Moreover, Helmer was clearly an enemy of Ormus and even Albedo.

Juli Mizrahi
Voiced by (English): Kim Mai Guest (Episodes II & III)Voiced by (Japanese): Naomi Shindou

 heads investigations into the appearances of the alien scourge called the Gnosis. She formed the Subcommittee on Close Encounters, also known as the S.O.C.E., in T.C. 4754. Based in Federation Capital Fifth Jerusalem, she is the ex-wife of Joachim Mizrahi, creator of M.O.M.O. and founder of U-TIC. Although the 100 Series Realian child is registered as her daughter, Juli has a secret reason for wanting the cyborg mercenary Ziggurat 8 to transport M.O.M.O. to the Miltian star system, instead of bringing her back to the Federation Capital: the analysis of the Y-Data hidden deep within M.O.M.O.'s subconscious.

In Episode I, Juli would rather not have anything to do with M.O.M.O., even though she is legally M.O.M.O.'s mother. She never quite got comfortable with the fact that her husband, Joachim created M.O.M.O. in the image of their late daughter, Sakura. She felt like M.O.M.O. was some sort of sick attempt to replace or recreate Sakura and she could not bring herself to try and relate to her. After speaking with Ziggy however her view of M.O.M.O. started to change. Ziggy, who had come to know M.O.M.O. as a real person since he rescued her, suggested that Juli not see M.O.M.O. as an attempt to replace her daughter but as a second daughter. Juli began to open up more and more to M.O.M.O. after that point and began to realize that she was indeed her own unique person and not just a copy of Sakura. After the events in Xenosaga Episode II, she decided to live with M.O.M.O. and accepted her role as her mother, with Ziggy on standby should a crisis arise.

Her maiden name is Niwashiro.

In German, in Dutch and in Swedish, "Juli" means "July."

Nephilim
Voiced by (English): Kim Mai Guest (Episodes II & III)Voiced by (Japanese): Yumi Tōma 

 is a mysterious red-eyed girl who first appears before Shion in the Encephalon. She also appears when Shion sees the Zohar Emulator for the first time on the Woglinde. Later she appears in Shion's dreams warning her about Cherenkov's condition. Shion was the only one able to see Nephilim until she and the party arrived at Encephalon where everybody can normally see her. In the Encephalon, Nephilim warns the party about U-DO and the awakening of the "true form of KOS-MOS." Abel is shown briefly appearing before Shion Uzuki and Dr. Juli Mizrahi scribbling a picture of a girl who looks like Nephilim.

Sometimes when Shion sees Nephilim in Episode I, a cross is seen swinging back and forth similar to the cross animation sequence that appears every time Fei Fong Wong sees himself as a child in Xenogears. An interesting similarity is that she very much resembles a young Elly from Xenogears, with both having the same Japanese voice actor in Yumi Tōma. This is further shown in that Abel appears to be drawing a picture of a girl who looks something like Nephilim.

She existed as a human during the era of Lost Jerusalem. At that time, the Zohar was excavated from Lake Turkana and shipped to Toronto, Canada, where its analysis began. After it had been discovered that the Zohar produced tremendous energy in response to a specific brainwave wavelength, everyone had become fixated upon finding a method to extract it. Systems programmer Grimoire Verum completed the control program Lemegeton based on the ancient language that had been unearthed from the same ruins as the Zohar.

The system went out of control during a control experiment, and the young girl participating in the experiment became the first to disappear. The disappearance phenomenon continued to expand, eventually erasing all of Earth from dimensional space. The girl who disappeared at this time was none other than Nephilim.

From the fact the girl's disappearance coincided with the appearance of Abel, it can be deduced that the two share a cause-and-effect relationship.

The Song of Nephilim is the result of amplifying the wavelength created by the Lemegeton through the use of a giant tuning fork. That system was designed and built by Joachim Mizrahi.

"Nephilim" is the name of the race of giants referred to in the Bible. According to the Book of Enoch and the Bible, the Nephilim were the offspring of the "sons of God" (angels) who descended to Earth and cohabited with the "daughters of men." This was one of the reasons for the Great Flood. Nephilim means "watchers," or "those who have come down," although Nephila also means "Orion" in Aramaic. This alludes to an extraterrestrial influence.

During the ending clip from Xenosaga III, Nephilim is seen absorbing the gnosis and transforming into an adult version of herself looking exactly like Elly.

Wilhelm
Voiced by (English): Jason Spisak (Episode II and III); Vic Mignogna (anime)Wilhelm is the CEO of the Vector Industries and the overarching antagonist of Xenosaga.

In reality, Wilhelm is an immortal being as old as the beginning of time. He was created to prevent the destruction of the Lower Domain of the universe, except he has been doing so through eternal recurrence.

Testament
The Testaments''' are Wilhelm's closest assistants and servants. Characterized by colored robes with matching beaklike masks, the true nature and power of the Testaments is unknown. It is hinted that they possess the power to manipulate space, and they seem to be able to appear and disappear at will. Also, each Testament has their own E.S., a special kind of spacecraft that contains a Vessel of Anima. Four Testaments exist by the end of Episode II: red, blue, black, and white.

In terms of allusions and references, the four Evangelists John, Mark, Matthew and Luke who wrote the Gospels which are part of the New Testament are sometimes depicted as wearing cloaks of these four colors. The four compass directions in several cultures, including Feng Shui, and Aztec mythology, are equivalent to these four colors. It is also possible they allude to the Four Horsemen of the Apocalypse, though this is unlikely because blue is not a color of the horsemen [though this is debatable as the translation usually is made as Pale which is usually interpreted as green to blue] (also because chaos refers to the U.R.T.V.s as the horsemen). They are more likely connected with the Gnostic concept of Archons which were powerful agents of the Demiurge who often wore animal masks and/or came in the form of animals. The fact that the Testaments often wear masks as well as the fact that their E.S. craft all resemble different animals (as opposed to every other E.S. having a more human like appearance) supports this.

Appearances in other media
In addition the Xenosaga universe, the three female protagonists: Shion, KOS-MOS and M.O.M.O., have also appeared in Namco × Capcom for the PlayStation 2 as playable characters.

KOS-MOS and T-elos has also appeared in the Nintendo DS game Super Robot Taisen OG Saga: Endless Frontier.
KOS-MOS and T-elos appeared again alongside M. O. M. O. in the sequel of the first Endless Frontier game Super Robot Taisen OG Saga: Endless Frontier EXCEED.

KOS-MOS and T-elos appeared in the Nintendo 3DS game Project X Zone and again in the sequel Project X Zone 2.

KOS-MOS and T-elos most recently appeared together as obtainable Blades in Xenoblade Chronicles 2Merchandise
The three female protagonists: Shion, KOS-MOS and MOMO, have had a figurine set released for them.

Reception
The Episode I versions of the characters have been criticized for being too doll-like. However the reviews of later character designs were more positive. 1UP said at the "Tokyo Game Show", Episode II's redesigns were among "...some of the prettiest pictures on the show floor..." specifically naming Shion, KOS-MOS and MOMO.

1UP comments on the replacement of most of the English voice cast being a "surprising move", especially as some other major cast members keep their voice actors, particularly Commander Margulis's voice actor is praised. Later they admit that the change in voice actors is not particularly jarring due to the different character designs.

MOMO Mizrahi
In a review by Edge for Episode III, the site claims that the reason the game scored two 9s by Famitsu, one of which was that "[t]here's a little girl robot [MOMO] whose panties are visible 99% of the time." Another review by the same site criticizes the character, calling her "designed by...a pervert." The reviewer goes on to theorize that much of the gaming world was "enthralled" enough by trying to figure out why this was the case that they were able to play through the game.

The more realistic redesign of MOMO's figure in Episode II plays down her magical school-girl nature. GameSpot criticized her beret, which did not appear in the original game, labeling it "jaunty" and deploring its "unfortunate" return in Xenosaga III''.

References

Xenosaga